This is a list of U.S. state and local law enforcement agencies — local, regional, special and statewide government agencies (state police) of the U.S. states, of the federal district, and of the territories that provide law enforcement duties, including investigations, prevention and patrol functions. In addition, the Attorney General's office of each state may have their own investigators.

The Bureau of Justice Statistics conducted a census of state and local law enforcement agencies every four years 1992-2008.

States and DC

List of law enforcement agencies in Alabama
List of law enforcement agencies in Alaska
List of law enforcement agencies in Arizona
List of law enforcement agencies in Arkansas
List of law enforcement agencies in California
List of law enforcement agencies in Colorado
List of law enforcement agencies in Connecticut
List of law enforcement agencies in Delaware
List of law enforcement agencies in Florida
List of law enforcement agencies in Georgia
List of law enforcement agencies in Hawaii
List of law enforcement agencies in Idaho
List of law enforcement agencies in Illinois
List of law enforcement agencies in Indiana
List of law enforcement agencies in Iowa
List of law enforcement agencies in Kansas
List of law enforcement agencies in Kentucky
List of law enforcement agencies in Louisiana
List of law enforcement agencies in Maine
List of law enforcement agencies in Maryland
List of law enforcement agencies in Massachusetts
List of law enforcement agencies in Michigan
List of law enforcement agencies in Minnesota
List of law enforcement agencies in Mississippi
List of law enforcement agencies in Missouri
List of law enforcement agencies in Montana
List of law enforcement agencies in Nebraska
List of law enforcement agencies in Nevada
List of law enforcement agencies in New Hampshire
List of law enforcement agencies in New Jersey
List of law enforcement agencies in New Mexico
List of law enforcement agencies in New York
List of law enforcement agencies in North Carolina
List of law enforcement agencies in North Dakota
List of law enforcement agencies in Ohio
List of law enforcement agencies in Oklahoma
List of law enforcement agencies in Oregon
List of law enforcement agencies in Pennsylvania
List of law enforcement agencies in Rhode Island
List of law enforcement agencies in South Carolina
List of law enforcement agencies in South Dakota
List of law enforcement agencies in Tennessee
List of law enforcement agencies in Texas
List of law enforcement agencies in Utah
List of law enforcement agencies in Vermont
List of law enforcement agencies in Virginia
List of law enforcement agencies in Washington (state)
List of law enforcement agencies in Washington, D.C.
List of law enforcement agencies in West Virginia
List of law enforcement agencies in Wisconsin
List of law enforcement agencies in Wyoming

Territories
Law enforcement in American Samoa
Law enforcement in Guam
Law enforcement in the Northern Mariana Islands
Law enforcement in Puerto Rico
Law enforcement in the United States Virgin Islands

See also

Law enforcement in the United States
Federal law enforcement in the United States
List of largest local police departments in the United States
Police
State police
State Bureau of Investigation
Highway patrol
Sheriff

External links 
 

 List
United States

sv:Polisen i USA